Johan Verstrepen (born 21 October 1967 in Herentals) is a Belgian former racing cyclist.

Palmares
1989
1st Overall Tour du Hainaut Occidental
1st Stage 1b
1st Stage 3 Circuit Franco Belge
1999
1st Stage 3 Étoile de Bessèges

References

1967 births
Living people
Belgian male cyclists
People from Herentals
Cyclists from Antwerp Province